Leah Evans (born 5 March 1997) is a 2.0 point British wheelchair basketball player who represented Great Britain at the 2015 Women's U25 Wheelchair Basketball World Championship in Beijing.

Biography
Leah Evans was born in Wakefield, on 5 March 1997. She was born with a rare hip condition that restricted her growth and movement. When she was four years old, she was told that she would never walk. However, she did and also danced six days a week. In 2012, she had a serious fall. She was taken to hospital where her hip was surgically reconstructed. She was given the news that she would require a wheelchair, and would not be able to dance.

Although Evans had never been what she calls a "sporty type", she took up wheelchair basketball in 2013. She is a 2.5 point player.  She began playing for the Sheffield Steelers. She played for England North at the Sainsbury's School Games in 2013, winning gold, and was captain of the team in 2014, winning silver. That year she played with the U25 national team at the European Championships in Hanover, Germany, where she won silver, and with the Steelers at the Copper Box in the National Paralympic Day game against the Netherlands. In 2015, she made her debut with the senior team at the Osaka Cup in Japan, winning silver, won a gold medal at the 2015 Women's U25 Wheelchair Basketball World Championship in Beijing, and played for the senior team at European Championships in Worcester, winning bronze. She launched an appeal to help buy a new sports chair, which costs £3750. In May 2016, she was named as part of the team for the 2016 Summer Paralympics in Rio de Janeiro. The British team produced its best ever performance at the Paralympics, making it to the semi-finals, but lost in the semi-final to the United States, and then the bronze medal match to the Netherlands.

Evans completed her A-levels, and in September 2015 entered the University of Worcester, where she intends to study Sports Science.

Achievements
2014: Silver at the 2014 Women's U25 Wheelchair Basketball European Championship (Hanover, Germany)
2015: Silver at the Osaka Cup (Osaka, Japan)   
2015: Gold at the 2015 Women's U25 Wheelchair Basketball World Championship (Beijing, China)
2015: Bronze at the European Championships (Worcester, England) 
 2016: Fourth at the 2016 Paralympics (Rio de Janeiro, Brazil)
 2017: Bronze at the European Championships (Tenerife, Spain)
 2018: Silver at the  2018 Wheelchair Basketball World Championship (Hamburg, Germany)

References

British women's wheelchair basketball players
1997 births
Living people
People from Wakefield
Paralympic wheelchair basketball players of Great Britain
Wheelchair basketball players at the 2016 Summer Paralympics